Madhura Hemant Naik is an Indian model and actress who has appeared in television shows such as Pyaar Kii Ye Ek Kahani, Iss Pyaar Ko Kya Naam Doon, Hum Ne Li Hai- Shapath and Tumhari Pakhi.

Career
Naik began her career as a model which led her to the music video "Umar Bhar" by Shael Oswal. She then worked in Bhaskar Bharti on Sony and Ek Nanad Ki Khushiyon Ki Chaabi… Meri Bhabhi.

As the lead in Hum Ne Li Hai- Shapath on Life OK during which she became an exclusive face with Star Network and appeared in many live performances and stage shows with Life OK and Star. She also played Sheetal Kapoor in the popular Star Plus series Iss Pyaar Ko Kya Naam Doon.

She was a co-host on UTV Bindass' show Superdude. She appeared in a cameo role as a lawyer named Jaspreet, in Star Plus's daily soap Ek Nanad Ki Khushiyon Ki Chaabi… Meri Bhabhi. She was seen as Tanya Rana, on Life OK's Tumhari Pakhi. She played the grey role of Palomi, who loves lead actor in "Tu Sooraj Main Saanjh, Piyaji". She was raised in Bahrain and had difficulty in speaking good Hindi in earlier days of her career.

Social and political causes
Naik, who is also an advocate for animal rights, extended her hand to PETA in stop caging the birds cause. She integrated it as a promotional activity while shooting for Superdude.

Filmography

Web series

Television

References

External links

Living people
Indian television actresses
Female models from Madhya Pradesh
Indian women playback singers
Indian soap opera actresses
Indian film actresses
Actresses from Indore
Actresses in Hindi television
Actresses in Hindi cinema
21st-century Indian actresses
Singers from Madhya Pradesh
Musicians from Indore
21st-century Indian women singers
21st-century Indian singers
1987 births